Bulelani Vukwana (also referred to as Bulelani Vukwane) was a South African spree killer who, after a quarrel with his girlfriend, shot to death 11 people and injured a further 6 in Mdantsane township, near East London, on 9 February 2002, before committing suicide.

Shooting spree
In the evening of 9 February 2002 29-year-old Bulelani Vukwana, who worked as a security guard for Gray Security Services, arrived at the home of his girlfriend Noluvuyo Mbenya, who apparently had ended their relationship earlier, to persuade her to come back to him. As she refused to see him, enraged Vukwana went to a nearby shebeen, arriving there at about 8:30pm, and wounded the owner Nosisi Skweyiya, by shooting her in the buttocks when she opened the door. He then went to the back of the bar, shot another man dead, and afterwards returned to his girlfriend's house, where a family function was in progress.

A friend persuaded Ms. Mbenya to go out and talk to Vukwana, but when she opened the door, he shot her point blank in the head, killing her instantly. The drunk gunman also murdered her father who came to investigate the cause of the hubbub, as well as another man, and, shouting "I have now come to finish it!", he chased her family back into their house, where they locked themselves up, waiting for the crazy man to leave.

After a while Vukwana left the Mbenya house and forced entry to the home of Lindiwe Ntoni next door, where he, during a fight, hit her with the gun on the head, but failing to overwhelm and shoot her, he left.

Back in the streets Vukwana hijacked a passing Golf, forced the driver and three passengers out at gunpoint and drove back to the shebeen, where he arrived at the same time as Lulamile Phantsi and his wife, who were called for help. The gunman immediately shot at Mr. Phantsi in his Isuzu, hitting him fatally in the neck.

Vukwana promised Mrs. Phantsi he would not kill her, but forced her to go to the shebeen to look for someone who he believed had been interfering in his relationship with Noluvuyo, but when no one opened they went back to her car, where he dragged out the body and demanded Phantsi's gun and mobile phone.

With his newly obtained pistol the gunman sped off in Phantsis' pick-up truck, driving to Ma Radebe's shebeen about 50 meters from the Mbenya home, where he killed one man, injured another person and finally started shooting randomly at motorists and pedestrians killing several people including the driver of a passing car and two passengers in another.

When he was spotted by police, Vukwana abandoned his vehicle, fired several shots at the officers and made his way between the houses in an attempt to escape. At about 10pm, realizing he was cornered, Vukwana ended his murder spree by shooting himself in the head.

Victims

Dead

Injured

References

External links
 Spurned boyfriend shoots dead 10, The Daily Telegraph (11 February 2002)
 Gunman kills 10 in South Africa, BBC (10 February 2002)
 Homem mata 10 pessoas a tiros na África do Sul , BBC (10 February 2002)
 Seven shooting victims in serious condition, Asia Africa Intelligence Wire (10 February 2002)
Six Mdantsane shooting victims in stable condition, Asia Africa Intelligence Wire (9 February 2002)

1973 births
2002 suicides
Murder–suicides in Africa
South African mass murderers
Suicides by firearm in South Africa
People from Buffalo City Metropolitan Municipality
South African spree killers